Penn Manam is a 1952 Indian Tamil-language drama film directed and produced by S. Soundararajan. The film stars T. K. Shanmugam and M. V. Rajamma.

Plot
Paramasivam, a farmer who lives with his wife Meenakshi and three children in Thanjavur, finds life difficult. Unable to face the difficulties, he goes to Colombo without informing his wife, and joins a drama troupe there. One of his children dies and Meenakshi is harassed by people. She tries to kill the other two children along with herself by jumping into a river with the children. However, they are saved by a sadhu (ascetic). In Colombo, Paramasivam saves a child from being run over by a car. The car owner gives Paramasivam money in gratitude, and the latter returns to his village in India. Whether he succeeds in finding his family and whether all are able to live together forms the rest of the story.

Cast

T. K. Shanmugam as Paramasivam
V. K. Ramasami
S. A. Natarajan
M. V. Rajamma as Meenakshi
M. N. Rajam
C. T. Rajakantham
Menaka
K. S. Angamuthu
Muthulakshmi
Pulimoottai Ramasami
Kottapuli Jayaraman

Crew
Production, Screenplay and Direction: S. Soundararajan
Story, Dialogues and Lyrics: Thanjai N. Ramaiah Dass
Cinematography: M. R. Purushotham
Studio: Shyamala Studios

Production
Shooting took place at the now non-existent Shyamala Studios.

Soundtrack
The music of the film was composed by Kunnakudi Venkatarama Iyer assisted by T. A. Kalyanam. Lyrics were written by Thanjai N. Ramaiah Dass. The singers are M. L. Vasanthakumari, A. V. Saraswathi, A. P. Komala, T. A. Mothi, Madhavapeddi Satyam and Kunnakudi Venkatarama Iyer.

References

1952 films
1950s Tamil-language films
Films scored by Kunnakudi Venkatarama Iyer